Lukhmanovskaya is a station on the Nekrasovskaya line of the Moscow Metro. It was opened on 3 June 2019 as a part of the inaugural stretch of the line, between Kosino and Nekrasovka.

Name
The station name was originally planned as Kosino-Ukhtomsky, after the Kosino-Ukhtomsky District in Moscow. In 2014, the municipal committee responsible for naming public buildings decided on Lyuberetsky. In February, the Mayor of Moscow, Sergey Sobyanin, issued a decree to name the station Lukhmanovskaya. The name comes from Lukhmanovskaya Street, which in turn, is named for Dmitry Lukhmanov, a 19th-century Russian merchant.

References

Moscow Metro stations
Railway stations in Russia opened in 2019
Nekrasovskaya line